Clive Staples Lewis, FBA (29 November 1898 – 22 November 1963) was a British writer and Anglican lay theologian. He held academic positions in English literature at both Oxford University (Magdalen College, 1925–1954) and Cambridge University (Magdalene College, 1954–1963). He is best known as the author of The Chronicles of Narnia, but he is also noted for his other works of fiction, such as The Screwtape Letters and The Space Trilogy, and for his non-fiction Christian apologetics, including Mere Christianity, Miracles, and The Problem of Pain.

Lewis was a close friend of J. R. R. Tolkien, author of The Lord of the Rings. Both men served on the English faculty at Oxford University and were active in the informal Oxford literary group known as the Inklings. According to Lewis's 1955 memoir Surprised by Joy, he was baptized in the Church of Ireland but fell away from his faith during adolescence. Lewis returned to Anglicanism at the age of 32, owing to the influence of Tolkien and other friends, and he became an "ordinary layman of the Church of England". Lewis's faith profoundly affected his work, and his wartime radio broadcasts on the subject of Christianity brought him wide acclaim.

Lewis wrote more than 30 books which have been translated into more than 30 languages and have sold millions of copies. The books that make up The Chronicles of Narnia have sold the most and have been popularized on stage, TV, radio, and cinema. His philosophical writings are widely cited by Christian scholars from many denominations.

In 1956, Lewis married American writer Joy Davidman; she died of cancer four years later at the age of 45. Lewis died on 22 November 1963 from kidney failure, one week before his 65th birthday. In 2013, on the 50th anniversary of his death, Lewis was honoured with a memorial in Poets' Corner in Westminster Abbey.

Biography

Childhood

Clive Staples Lewis was born in Belfast in Ulster, Ireland (before partition), on 29 November 1898. His father was Albert James Lewis (1863–1929), a solicitor whose father Richard Lewis had come to Ireland from Wales during the mid-19th century. Lewis's mother was Florence Augusta Lewis  Hamilton (1862–1908), known as Flora, the daughter of Thomas Hamilton, a Church of Ireland priest, and the great-granddaughter of both Bishop Hugh Hamilton and John Staples. Lewis had an elder brother,  Warren Hamilton Lewis (known as "Warnie"). He was baptized on 29 January 1899 by his maternal grandfather in St Mark's Church, Dundela.

When his dog Jacksie was killed by a car, the four-year old Lewis adopted the name Jacksie. At first, he would answer to no other name, but later accepted Jack, the name by which he was known to friends and family for the rest of his life. When he was seven, his family moved into "Little Lea", the family home of his childhood, in the Strandtown area of East Belfast.

As a boy, Lewis was fascinated with anthropomorphic animals; he fell in love with Beatrix Potter's stories and often wrote and illustrated his own animal tales. Along with his brother Warnie, he created the world of Boxen, a fantasy land inhabited and run by animals. Lewis loved to read from an early age. His father's house was filled with books; he later wrote that finding something to read was as easy as walking into a field and "finding a new blade of grass".

Lewis was schooled by private tutors until age nine, when his mother died in 1908 from cancer. His father then sent him to England to live and study at Wynyard School in Watford, Hertfordshire. Lewis's brother had enrolled there three years previously. Not long after, the school was closed due to a lack of pupils. Lewis then attended Campbell College in the east of Belfast about a mile from his home, but left after a few months due to respiratory problems.

He was then sent back to England to the health-resort town of Malvern, Worcestershire, where he attended the preparatory school Cherbourg House, which Lewis referred to as "Chartres" in his autobiography. It was during this time that he abandoned the Christianity he was taught as a child and became an atheist. During this time he also developed a fascination with European mythology and the occult.

In September 1913, Lewis enrolled at Malvern College, where he remained until the following June. He found the school socially competitive. After leaving Malvern, he studied privately with William T. Kirkpatrick, his father's old tutor and former headmaster of Lurgan College.

As a teenager, Lewis was wonderstruck by the songs and legends of what he called Northernness, the ancient literature of Scandinavia preserved in the Icelandic sagas. These legends intensified an inner longing that he would later call "joy". He also grew to love nature; its beauty reminded him of the stories of the North, and the stories of the North reminded him of the beauties of nature. His teenage writings moved away from the tales of Boxen, and he began experimenting with different art forms such as epic poetry and opera to try to capture his new-found interest in Norse mythology and the natural world.

Studying with Kirkpatrick ("The Great Knock", as Lewis afterward called him) instilled in him a love of Greek literature and mythology and sharpened his debate and reasoning skills. In 1916, Lewis was awarded a scholarship at University College, Oxford.

"My Irish life"

Lewis experienced a certain cultural shock on first arriving in England: "No Englishman will be able to understand my first impressions of England," Lewis wrote in Surprised by Joy. "The strange English accents with which I was surrounded seemed like the voices of demons. But what was worst was the English landscape ... I have made up the quarrel since; but at that moment I conceived a hatred for England which took many years to heal."

From boyhood, Lewis had immersed himself in Norse and Greek mythology, and later in Irish mythology and literature. He also expressed an interest in the Irish language, though there is not much evidence that he laboured to learn it. He developed a particular fondness for W. B. Yeats, in part because of Yeats's use of Ireland's Celtic heritage in poetry. In a letter to a friend, Lewis wrote, "I have here discovered an author exactly after my own heart, whom I am sure you would delight in, W. B. Yeats. He writes plays and poems of rare spirit and beauty about our old Irish mythology."

In 1921, Lewis met Yeats twice, since Yeats had moved to Oxford. Lewis was surprised to find his English peers indifferent to Yeats and the Celtic Revival movement, and wrote: "I am often surprised to find how utterly ignored Yeats is among the men I have met: perhaps his appeal is purely Irish – if so, then thank the gods that I am Irish." Early in his career, Lewis considered sending his work to the major Dublin publishers, writing: "If I do ever send my stuff to a publisher, I think I shall try Maunsel, those Dublin people, and so tack myself definitely onto the Irish school."

After his conversion to Christianity, his interests gravitated towards Christian theology and away from pagan Celtic mysticism (as opposed to Celtic Christian mysticism).

Lewis occasionally expressed a somewhat tongue-in-cheek chauvinism towards the English. Describing an encounter with a fellow Irishman, he wrote: "Like all Irish people who meet in England, we ended by criticisms on the invincible flippancy and dullness of the Anglo-Saxon race. After all, there is no doubt, ami, that the Irish are the only people: with all their faults, I would not gladly live or die among another folk." Throughout his life, he sought out the company of other Irish people living in England and visited Northern Ireland regularly. In 1958 he spent his honeymoon there at the Old Inn, Crawfordsburn, which he called "my Irish life".

Various critics have suggested that it was Lewis's dismay over the sectarian conflict in his native Belfast which led him to eventually adopt such an ecumenical brand of Christianity. As one critic has said, Lewis "repeatedly extolled the virtues of all branches of the Christian faith, emphasising a need for unity among Christians around what the Catholic writer  called 'Mere Christianity', the core doctrinal beliefs that all denominations share". On the other hand, Paul Stevens of the University of Toronto has written that "Lewis' mere Christianity masked many of the political prejudices of an old-fashioned Ulster Protestant, a native of middle-class Belfast for whom British withdrawal from Northern Ireland even in the 1950s and 1960s was unthinkable."

First World War and Oxford University

Lewis entered Oxford in the 1917 summer term, studying at University College, and shortly after, he joined the Officers' Training Corps at the university as his "most promising route into the army". From there, he was drafted into a Cadet Battalion for training. After his training, he was commissioned into the 3rd Battalion of the Somerset Light Infantry of the British Army as a Second Lieutenant, and was later transferred to the 1st Battalion of the regiment, then serving in France (he would not remain with the 3rd Battalion as it moved to Northern Ireland). Within months of entering Oxford, he was shipped by the British Army to France to fight in the First World War.

On his 19th birthday (29 November 1917), Lewis arrived at the front line in the Somme Valley in France, where he experienced trench warfare for the first time. On 15 April 1918, as 1st Battalion, Somerset Light Infantry assaulted the village of Riez du Vinage in the midst of the German spring offensive, Lewis was wounded and two of his colleagues were killed by a British shell falling short of its target. He was depressed and homesick during his convalescence and, upon his recovery in October, he was assigned to duty in Andover, England. He was demobilized in December 1918 and soon restarted his studies. In a later letter, Lewis stated that his experience of the horrors of war, along with the loss of his mother and unhappiness in school, were the basis of his pessimism and atheism.

After Lewis returned to Oxford University, he received a First in Honour Moderations (Greek and Latin literature) in 1920, a First in Greats (Philosophy and Ancient History) in 1922, and a First in English in 1923. In 1924 he became a Philosophy tutor at University College and, in 1925, was elected a Fellow and Tutor in English Literature at Magdalen College, where he served for 29 years until 1954.

Janie Moore
During his army training, Lewis shared a room with another cadet, Edward Courtnay Francis "Paddy" Moore (1898–1918). Maureen Moore, Paddy's sister, said that the two made a mutual pact that if either died during the war, the survivor would take care of both of their families. Paddy was killed in action in 1918 and Lewis kept his promise. Paddy had earlier introduced Lewis to his mother, Janie King Moore, and a friendship quickly sprang up between Lewis, who was 18 when they met, and Janie, who was 45. The friendship with Moore was particularly important to Lewis while he was recovering from his wounds in hospital, as his father did not visit him.

Lewis lived with and cared for Moore until she was hospitalized in the late 1940s. He routinely introduced her as his mother, referred to her as such in letters, and developed a deeply affectionate friendship with her. Lewis's own mother had died when he was a child, while his father was distant, demanding, and eccentric.

Speculation regarding their relationship resurfaced with the 1990 publication of A. N. Wilson's biography of Lewis. Wilson (who never met Lewis) attempted to make a case for their having been lovers for a time. Wilson's biography was not the first to address the question of Lewis's relationship with Moore. George Sayer knew Lewis for 29 years, and he had sought to shed light on the relationship during the period of 14 years before Lewis's conversion to Christianity. In his biography Jack: A Life of C. S. Lewis, he wrote:

Later Sayer changed his mind. In the introduction to the 1997 edition of his biography of Lewis he wrote:

However, the romantic nature of the relationship is doubted by other writers; for example, Philip Zaleski and Carol Zaleski write in The Fellowship that

Lewis spoke well of Mrs. Moore throughout his life, saying to his friend George Sayer, "She was generous and taught me to be generous, too." In December 1917, Lewis wrote in a letter to his childhood friend Arthur Greeves that Janie and Greeves were "the two people who matter most to me in the world".

In 1930, Lewis moved into The Kilns with his brother Warnie, Mrs. Moore, and her daughter Maureen. The Kilns was a house in the district of Headington Quarry on the outskirts of Oxford, now part of the suburb of Risinghurst. They all contributed financially to the purchase of the house, which eventually passed to Maureen, who by then was Dame Maureen Dunbar, when Warren died in 1973.

Moore had dementia in her later years and was eventually moved into a nursing home, where she died in 1951. Lewis visited her every day in this home until her death.

Return to Christianity
Lewis was raised in a religious family that attended the Church of Ireland. He became an atheist at age 15, though he later described his young self as being paradoxically "very angry with God for not existing" and "equally angry with him for creating a world". His early separation from Christianity began when he started to view his religion as a chore and a duty; around this time, he also gained an interest in the occult, as his studies expanded to include such topics. Lewis quoted Lucretius (De rerum natura, 5.198–9) as having one of the strongest arguments for atheism:

which he translated poetically as follows:

Had God designed the world, it would not be
A world so frail and faulty as we see.

(This is a highly poetic, rather than a literal translation.  A more literal translation, by William Ellery Leonard, reads: "That in no wise the nature of all things / For us was fashioned by a power divine – / So great the faults it stands encumbered with.")

Lewis's interest in the works of the Scottish writer George MacDonald was part of what turned him from atheism. This can be seen particularly well through this passage in Lewis's The Great Divorce, chapter nine, when the semi-autobiographical main character meets MacDonald in Heaven:

He eventually returned to Christianity, having been influenced by arguments with his Oxford colleague and friend J. R. R. Tolkien, whom he seems to have met for the first time on 11 May 1926, as well as the book The Everlasting Man by G. K. Chesterton. Lewis vigorously resisted conversion, noting that he was brought into Christianity like a prodigal, "kicking, struggling, resentful, and darting his eyes in every direction for a chance to escape". He described his last struggle in Surprised by Joy:

After his conversion to theism in 1929, Lewis converted to Christianity in 1931, following a long discussion during a late-night walk along Addison's Walk with close friends Tolkien and Hugo Dyson. He records making a specific commitment to Christian belief while on his way to the zoo with his brother. He became a member of the Church of England – somewhat to the disappointment of Tolkien, who had hoped that he would join the Catholic Church.

Lewis was a committed Anglican who upheld a largely orthodox Anglican theology, though in his apologetic writings, he made an effort to avoid espousing any one denomination. In his later writings, some believe that he proposed ideas such as purification of venial sins after death in purgatory (The Great Divorce and Letters to Malcolm) and mortal sin (The Screwtape Letters), which are generally considered to be Roman Catholic teachings, although they are also widely held in Anglicanism (particularly in high church Anglo-Catholic circles). Regardless, Lewis considered himself an entirely orthodox Anglican to the end of his life, reflecting that he had initially attended church only to receive communion and had been repelled by the hymns and the poor quality of the sermons. He later came to consider himself honoured by worshipping with men of faith who came in shabby clothes and work boots and who sang all the verses to all the hymns.

Second World War
After the outbreak of the Second World War in 1939, the Lewises took child evacuees from London and other cities into The Kilns. Lewis was only 40 when the war began, and he tried to re-enter military service, offering to instruct cadets; however, his offer was not accepted. He rejected the recruiting office's suggestion of writing columns for the Ministry of Information in the press, as he did not want to "write lies" to deceive the enemy. He later served in the local Home Guard in Oxford.

From 1941 to 1943, Lewis spoke on religious programmes broadcast by the BBC from London while the city was under periodic air raids. These broadcasts were appreciated by civilians and servicemen at that stage. For example, Air Chief Marshal Sir Donald Hardman wrote:

"The war, the whole of life, everything tended to seem pointless. We needed, many of us, a key to the meaning of the universe. Lewis provided just that."

The youthful Alistair Cooke was less impressed, and in 1944 described  "the alarming vogue of Mr. C.S. Lewis" as an example of how wartime tends to "spawn so many quack religions and Messiahs". The broadcasts were anthologized in Mere Christianity. From 1941, Lewis was occupied at his summer holiday weekends visiting R.A.F. stations to speak on his faith, invited by  Chaplain-in-Chief Maurice Edwards.

It was also during the same wartime period that Lewis was invited to become first President of the Oxford Socratic Club in January 1942, a position that he enthusiastically held until he resigned on appointment to Cambridge University in 1954.

Honour declined
Lewis was named on the last list of honours by George VI in December 1951 as a Commander of the Order of the British Empire (CBE) but declined so as to avoid association with any political issues.

Chair at Cambridge University
In 1954, Lewis accepted the newly founded chair in Mediaeval and Renaissance Literature at Magdalene College, Cambridge, where he finished his career. He maintained a strong attachment to the city of Oxford, keeping a home there and returning on weekends until his death in 1963.

Joy Davidman

In later life, Lewis corresponded with Joy Davidman Gresham, an American writer of Jewish background, a former Communist, and a convert from atheism to Christianity. She was separated from her alcoholic and abusive husband, novelist William L. Gresham, and came to England with her two sons, David and Douglas. Lewis at first regarded her as an agreeable intellectual companion and personal friend, and it was on this level that he agreed to enter into a civil marriage contract with her so that she could continue to live in the UK. They were married at the register office, 42 St Giles', Oxford, on 23 April 1956. Lewis's brother Warren wrote: "For Jack the attraction was at first undoubtedly intellectual. Joy was the only woman whom he had met ... who had a brain which matched his own in suppleness, in width of interest, and in analytical grasp, and above all in humour and a sense of fun." After complaining of a painful hip, she was diagnosed with terminal bone cancer, and the relationship developed to the point that they sought a Christian marriage. Since she was divorced, this was not straightforward in the Church of England at the time, but a friend, the Rev. Peter Bide, performed the ceremony at her bed in the Churchill Hospital on 21 March 1957.

Gresham's cancer soon went into remission, and the couple lived together as a family with Warren Lewis until 1960, when her cancer recurred. She died on 13 July 1960. Earlier that year, the couple took a brief holiday in Greece and the Aegean; Lewis was fond of walking but not of travel, and this marked his only crossing of the English Channel after 1918. Lewis's book A Grief Observed describes his experience of bereavement in such a raw and personal fashion that he originally released it under the pseudonym N. W. Clerk to keep readers from associating the book with him. Ironically, many friends recommended the book to Lewis as a method for dealing with his own grief. After Lewis's death, his authorship was made public by Faber's, with the permission of the executors.

Lewis continued to raise Gresham's two sons after her death. Douglas Gresham is a Christian like Lewis and his mother, while David Gresham turned to his mother's ancestral faith, becoming Orthodox Jewish in his beliefs. His mother's writings had featured the Jews in an unsympathetic manner, particularly on "shohet" (ritual slaughterer). David informed Lewis that he was going to become a ritual slaughterer to present this type of Jewish religious functionary to the world in a more favourable light. In a 2005 interview, Douglas Gresham acknowledged that he and his brother were not close, although they had corresponded via email. 

David died on 25 December 2014. In 2020, Douglas revealed that his brother had died at a Swiss mental hospital, and that when David was a young man he had been diagnosed with paranoid schizophrenia.

Illness and death

In early June 1961, Lewis began experiencing nephritis, which resulted in blood poisoning. His illness caused him to miss the autumn term at Cambridge, though his health gradually began improving in 1962 and he returned that April. His health continued to improve and, according to his friend George Sayer, Lewis was fully himself by early 1963.

On 15 July that year, Lewis fell ill and was admitted to the hospital; he had a heart attack at 5:00 pm the next day and lapsed into a coma, but unexpectedly woke the following day at 2:00 pm. After he was discharged from the hospital, Lewis returned to the Kilns, though he was too ill to return to work. As a result, he resigned from his post at Cambridge in August 1963.

Lewis's condition continued to decline, and he was diagnosed with end-stage kidney failure in mid-November. He collapsed in his bedroom at 5:30 pm on 22 November, exactly one week before his 65th birthday, and died a few minutes later. He is buried in the churchyard of Holy Trinity Church, Headington, Oxford. His brother Warren died on 9 April 1973 and was buried in the same grave.

Media coverage of Lewis's death was almost completely overshadowed by news of the assassination of John F. Kennedy, which occurred on the same day (approximately 55 minutes following Lewis's collapse), as did the death of English writer Aldous Huxley, author of Brave New World. This coincidence was the inspiration for Peter Kreeft's book Between Heaven and Hell: A Dialog Somewhere Beyond Death with John F. Kennedy, C. S. Lewis, & Aldous Huxley. Lewis is commemorated on 22 November in the church calendar of the Episcopal Church.

Career

Scholar

Lewis began his academic career as an undergraduate student at Oxford University, where he won a triple first, the highest honours in three areas of study. He was then elected a Fellow of Magdalen College, Oxford, where he worked for nearly thirty years, from 1925 to 1954. In 1954, he was awarded the newly founded chair of Mediaeval and Renaissance Literature at Cambridge University, and was elected a fellow of Magdalene College. Concerning his appointed academic field, he argued that there was no such thing as an English Renaissance. Much of his scholarly work concentrated on the later Middle Ages, especially its use of allegory. His The Allegory of Love (1936) helped reinvigorate the serious study of late medieval narratives such as the Roman de la Rose.

Lewis was commissioned to write the volume English Literature in the Sixteenth Century (Excluding Drama) for the Oxford History of English Literature. His book A Preface to Paradise Lost is still cited as a criticism of that work.  His last academic work, The Discarded Image: An Introduction to Medieval and Renaissance Literature (1964), is a summary of the medieval world view, a reference to the "discarded image" of the cosmos.

Lewis was a prolific writer, and his circle of literary friends became an informal discussion society known as the "Inklings", including J. R. R. Tolkien, Nevill Coghill, Lord David Cecil, Charles Williams, Owen Barfield, and his brother Warren Lewis. Glyer points to December 1929 as the Inklings' beginning date. Lewis's friendship with Coghill and Tolkien grew during their time as members of the Kolbítar, an Old Norse reading group that Tolkien founded and which ended around the time of the inception of the Inklings. At Oxford, he was the tutor of poet John Betjeman, critic Kenneth Tynan, mystic Bede Griffiths, novelist Roger Lancelyn Green and Sufi scholar Martin Lings, among many other undergraduates. Curiously, the religious and conservative Betjeman detested Lewis, whereas the anti-establishment Tynan retained a lifelong admiration for him.

Of Tolkien, Lewis writes in Surprised by Joy:

Novelist
In addition to his scholarly work, Lewis wrote several popular novels, including the science fiction Space Trilogy for adults and the Narnia fantasies for children. Most deal implicitly with Christian themes such as sin, humanity's fall from grace, and redemption.

His first novel after becoming a Christian was The Pilgrim's Regress (1933), which depicted his experience with Christianity in the style of John Bunyan's The Pilgrim's Progress. The book was poorly received by critics at the time, although David Martyn Lloyd-Jones, one of Lewis's contemporaries at Oxford, gave him much-valued encouragement. Asked by Lloyd-Jones when he would write another book, Lewis replied, "When I understand the meaning of prayer."

The Space Trilogy (also called the Cosmic Trilogy or Ransom Trilogy) dealt with what Lewis saw as the dehumanizing trends in contemporary science fiction. The first book, Out of the Silent Planet, was apparently written following a conversation with his friend J. R. R. Tolkien about these trends. Lewis agreed to write a "space travel" story and Tolkien a "time travel" one, but Tolkien never completed "The Lost Road", linking his Middle-earth to the modern world. Lewis's main character Elwin Ransom is based in part on Tolkien, a fact to which Tolkien alludes in his letters.

The second novel, Perelandra, depicts a new Garden of Eden on the planet Venus, a new Adam and Eve, and a new "serpent figure" to tempt Eve. The story can be seen as an account of what might have happened if the terrestrial Adam had defeated the serpent and avoided the Fall of Man, with Ransom intervening in the novel to "ransom" the new Adam and Eve from the deceptions of the enemy. The third novel, That Hideous Strength, develops the theme of nihilistic science threatening traditional human values, embodied in Arthurian legend.

Many ideas in the trilogy, particularly opposition to dehumanization as portrayed in the third book, are presented more formally in The Abolition of Man, based on a series of lectures by Lewis at Durham University in 1943. Lewis stayed in Durham, where he says he was overwhelmed by the magnificence of the cathedral. That Hideous Strength is in fact set in the environs of "Edgestow" university, a small English university like Durham, though Lewis disclaims any other resemblance between the two.

Walter Hooper, Lewis's literary executor, discovered a fragment of another science-fiction novel apparently written by Lewis called The Dark Tower. Ransom appears in the story but it is not clear whether the book was intended as part of the same series of novels. The manuscript was eventually published in 1977, though Lewis scholar Kathryn Lindskoog doubts its authenticity.

The Chronicles of Narnia, considered a classic of children's literature, is a series of seven fantasy novels. Written between 1949 and 1954 and illustrated by Pauline Baynes, the series is Lewis's most popular work, having sold over 100 million copies in 41 languages  . It has been adapted several times, complete or in part, for radio, television, stage and cinema.

The books contain Christian ideas intended to be easily accessible to young readers. In addition to Christian themes, Lewis also borrows characters from Greek and Roman mythology, as well as traditional British and Irish fairy tales.

Lewis's last novel, Till We Have Faces, a retelling of the myth of Cupid and Psyche, was published in 1956. Although Lewis called it "far and away my best book," it was not as well-reviewed as his previous work.

Other works
Lewis wrote several works on Heaven and Hell. One of these, The Great Divorce, is a short novella in which a few residents of Hell take a bus ride to Heaven, where they are met by people who dwell there. The proposition is that they can stay if they choose, in which case they can call the place where they had come from "Purgatory", instead of "Hell", but many find it not to their taste. The title is a reference to William Blake's The Marriage of Heaven and Hell, a concept that Lewis found a "disastrous error". This work deliberately echoes two other more famous works with a similar theme: the Divine Comedy of Dante Alighieri, and Bunyan's The Pilgrim's Progress.

Another short work, The Screwtape Letters, which he dedicated to J. R. R. Tolkien, consists of letters of advice from senior demon Screwtape to his nephew Wormwood on the best ways to tempt a particular human and secure his damnation. Lewis's last novel was Till We Have Faces, which he thought of as his most mature and masterly work of fiction but which was never a popular success. It is a retelling of the myth of Cupid and Psyche from the unusual perspective of Psyche's sister. It is deeply concerned with religious ideas, but the setting is entirely pagan, and the connections with specific Christian beliefs are left implicit.

Before Lewis's conversion to Christianity, he published two books: Spirits in Bondage, a collection of poems, and Dymer, a single narrative poem. Both were published under the pen name Clive Hamilton. Other narrative poems have since been published posthumously, including Launcelot, The Nameless Isle, and The Queen of Drum.

He also wrote The Four Loves, which rhetorically explains four categories of love: friendship, eros, affection, and charity.

In 2009, a partial draft was discovered of Language and Human Nature, which Lewis had begun co-writing with J. R. R. Tolkien, but which was never completed.

Christian apologist
Lewis is also regarded by many as one of the most influential Christian apologists of his time, in addition to his career as an English professor and an author of fiction. Mere Christianity was voted best book of the 20th century by Christianity Today in 2000. He has been called "The Apostle to the Skeptics" due to his approach to religious belief as a sceptic, and his following conversion.

Lewis was very interested in presenting an argument from reason against metaphysical naturalism and for the existence of God. Mere Christianity, The Problem of Pain, and Miracles were all concerned, to one degree or another, with refuting popular objections to Christianity, such as the question, "How could a good God allow pain to exist in the world?" He also became a popular lecturer and broadcaster, and some of his writing originated as scripts for radio talks or lectures (including much of Mere Christianity).

According to George Sayer, losing a 1948 debate with Elizabeth Anscombe, also a Christian, led Lewis to re-evaluate his role as an apologist, and his future works concentrated on devotional literature and children's books. Anscombe had a completely different recollection of the debate's outcome and its emotional effect on Lewis. Victor Reppert also disputes Sayer, listing some of Lewis's post-1948 apologetic publications, including the second and revised edition of his Miracles in 1960, in which Lewis addressed Anscombe's criticism. Noteworthy too is Roger Teichman's suggestion in The Philosophy of Elizabeth Anscombe that the intellectual impact of Anscombe's paper on Lewis's philosophical self-confidence should not be over-rated: "... it seems unlikely that he felt as irretrievably crushed as some of his acquaintances have made out; the episode is probably an inflated legend, in the same category as the affair of Wittgenstein's Poker. Certainly, Anscombe herself believed that Lewis's argument, though flawed, was getting at something very important; she thought that this came out more in the improved version of it that Lewis presented in a subsequent edition of Miracles – though that version also had 'much to criticize in it'."

Lewis wrote an autobiography titled Surprised by Joy, which places special emphasis on his own conversion. He also wrote many essays and public speeches on Christian belief, many of which were collected in God in the Dock and The Weight of Glory and Other Addresses.

His most famous works, the Chronicles of Narnia, contain many strong Christian messages and are often considered allegory. Lewis, an expert on the subject of allegory, maintained that the books were not allegory, and preferred to call the Christian aspects of them "suppositional". As Lewis wrote in a letter to a Mrs. Hook in December 1958:

Prior to his conversion, Lewis used the word "Moslem" to refer to Muslims, adherents of Islam; following his conversion, however, he started using "Mohammedans" and described Islam as a Christian heresy rather than an independent religion.

"Trilemma"

In a much-cited passage from Mere Christianity, Lewis challenged the view that Jesus was a great moral teacher but not God. He argued that Jesus made several implicit claims to divinity, which would logically exclude that claim:

Although this argument is sometimes called "Lewis's trilemma", Lewis did not invent it but rather developed and popularized it. It has also been used by Christian apologist Josh McDowell in his book More Than a Carpenter. It has been widely repeated in Christian apologetic literature, but largely ignored by professional theologians and biblical scholars.

Lewis's Christian apologetics, and this argument in particular, have been criticized. Philosopher John Beversluis described Lewis's arguments as "textually careless and theologically unreliable", and this particular argument as logically unsound and an example of a false dilemma. The Pluralist theologian John Hick claimed that New Testament scholars do not now support the view that Jesus claimed to be God. The Anglican New Testament scholar N. T. Wright criticizes Lewis for failing to recognize the significance of Jesus' Jewish identity and setting – an oversight which "at best, drastically short-circuits the argument" and which lays Lewis open to criticism that his argument "doesn't work as history, and it backfires dangerously when historical critics question his reading of the gospels", although he argues that this "doesn't undermine the eventual claim".

Lewis used a similar argument in The Lion, the Witch and the Wardrobe, when the old Professor advises his young guests that their sister's claims of a magical world must logically be taken as either lies, madness, or truth.

Universal morality
One of the main theses in Lewis's apologia is that there is a common morality known throughout humanity, which he calls "natural law". In the first five chapters of Mere Christianity, Lewis discusses the idea that people have a standard of behaviour to which they expect people to adhere. Lewis claims that people all over the earth know what this law is and when they break it. He goes on to claim that there must be someone or something behind such a universal set of principles.

Lewis also portrays Universal Morality in his works of fiction. In The Chronicles of Narnia he describes Universal Morality as the "deep magic" which everyone knew.

In the second chapter of Mere Christianity, Lewis recognizes that "many people find it difficult to understand what this Law of Human Nature ... is." And he responds first to the idea "that the Moral Law is simply our herd instinct" and second to the idea "that the Moral Law is simply a social convention". In responding to the second idea Lewis notes that people often complain that one set of moral ideas is better than another, but that this actually argues for there existing some "Real Morality" to which they are comparing other moralities. Finally, he notes that sometimes differences in moral codes are exaggerated by people who confuse differences in beliefs about morality with differences in beliefs about facts:

Lewis also had fairly progressive views on the topic of "animal morality", in particular the suffering of animals, as is evidenced by several of his essays: most notably, On Vivisection and "On the Pains of Animals".

Legacy

Lewis continues to attract a wide readership. In 2008, The Times ranked him eleventh on their list of "the 50 greatest British writers since 1945". Readers of his fiction are often unaware of what Lewis considered the Christian themes of his works. His Christian apologetics are read and quoted by members of many Christian denominations. In 2013, on the 50th anniversary of his death, Lewis joined some of Britain's greatest writers recognized at Poets' Corner, Westminster Abbey. The dedication service, at noon on 22 November 2013, included a reading from The Last Battle by Douglas Gresham, younger stepson of Lewis. Flowers were laid by Walter Hooper, trustee and literary advisor to the Lewis Estate. An address was delivered by former Archbishop of Canterbury Rowan Williams. The floor stone inscription is a quotation from an address by Lewis:

Lewis has been the subject of several biographies, a few of which were written by close friends, such as Roger Lancelyn Green and George Sayer. In 1985, the screenplay Shadowlands by William Nicholson dramatized Lewis's life and relationship with Joy Davidman Gresham. It was aired on British television starring Joss Ackland and Claire Bloom. This was also staged as a theatre play starring Nigel Hawthorne in 1989 and made into the 1993 feature film Shadowlands starring Anthony Hopkins and Debra Winger.

Many books have been inspired by Lewis, including A Severe Mercy by his correspondent and friend Sheldon Vanauken. The Chronicles of Narnia has been particularly influential. Modern children's literature has been more or less influenced by Lewis's series, such as Daniel Handler's A Series of Unfortunate Events, Eoin Colfer's Artemis Fowl, Philip Pullman's His Dark Materials, and J. K. Rowling's Harry Potter. Pullman is an atheist and is known to be sharply critical of C. S. Lewis's work, accusing Lewis of featuring religious propaganda, misogyny, racism, and emotional sadism in his books. However, he has also modestly praised The Chronicles of Narnia for being a "more serious" work of literature in comparison with Tolkien's "trivial" The Lord of the Rings. Authors of adult fantasy literature such as Tim Powers have also testified to being influenced by Lewis's work.

In A Sword Between the Sexes? C. S. Lewis and the Gender Debates, Mary Stewart Van Leeuwen finds in Lewis's work "a hierarchical and essentialist view of class and gender" corresponding to an upbringing during the Edwardian era.

Most of Lewis's posthumous work has been edited by his literary executor Walter Hooper. Kathryn Lindskoog, an independent Lewis scholar, argued that Hooper's scholarship is not reliable and that he has made false statements and attributed forged works to Lewis. Lewis's stepson, Douglas Gresham, denies the forgery claims, saying that "The whole controversy thing was engineered for very personal reasons ... Her fanciful theories have been pretty thoroughly discredited."

A bronze statue of Lewis's character Digory from The Magician's Nephew stands in Belfast's Holywood Arches in front of the Holywood Road Library.

Several C. S. Lewis Societies exist around the world, including one which was founded in Oxford in 1982. The C.S. Lewis Society at the University of Oxford meets at Pusey House during term time to discuss papers on the life and works of Lewis and the other Inklings, and generally appreciate all things Lewisian.

Live-action film adaptations have been made of three of The Chronicles of Narnia: The Lion, the Witch, and the Wardrobe (2005), Prince Caspian (2008) and The Voyage of the Dawn Treader (2010).

Lewis is featured as a main character in The Chronicles of the Imaginarium Geographica series by James A. Owen. He is one of two characters in Mark St. Germain's 2009 play Freud's Last Session, which imagines a meeting between Lewis, aged 40, and Sigmund Freud, aged 83, at Freud's house in Hampstead, London, in 1939, as the Second World War is about to break out.

In 2021, The Most Reluctant Convert, a biographical drama about Lewis's life and conversion, was released.

The CS Lewis Nature Reserve, on ground owned by Lewis, lies behind his house, The Kilns. There is public access.

Bibliography

See also

 Marion E. Wade Center at Wheaton College, has the world's largest collection of works by and about Lewis
 Courtly love
 Johan Huizinga
 D. W. Robertson, Jr.

Notes

References

 
 
 
 .
  [reprinted as ]
 
 
 
 
 
 
 
 .
 
 
 
 
 .
 
 
 .

Further reading

 
 
 Beversluis, John (1985), C. S. Lewis and the Search for Rational Religion. Grand Rapids: Eerdmans 
 Bresland, Ronald W. (1999), The Backward Glance: C. S. Lewis and Ireland. Belfast: Institute of Irish Studies at Queen's University of Belfast.
 Brown, Devin (2013), A Life Observed: A Spiritual Biography of C. S. Lewis. Grand Rapids: Brazos Press 
 Christopher, Joe R. & Joan K. Ostling (1972), C. S. Lewis: An Annotated Checklist of Writings About Him and His Works. Kent, Ohio: Kent State University Press, n.d. 
 Como, James (1998), Branches to Heaven: The Geniuses of C. S. Lewis. Spence
 Como, James (2006), Remembering C. S. Lewis (3rd edn. of C. S. Lewis at the Breakfast Table). Ignatius Press
 Connolly, Sean (2007), Inklings of Heaven: C. S. Lewis and Eschatology. Gracewing. 
 Coren, Michael (1994), The Man Who Created Narnia: The Story of C. S. Lewis. Grand Rapids: Eerdmans, reprint edition 1996 (First published 1994 in Canada by Lester Publishing Limited). 
 Derrick, Christopher (1981) C. S. Lewis and the Church of Rome: A Study in Proto-Ecumenism. Ignatius Press. 
 
 Downing, David C. (1992), Planets in Peril: A Critical Study of C. S. Lewis's Ransom Trilogy. Amherst: University of Massachusetts Press. 
 Downing, David C. (2002), The Most Reluctant Convert: C. S. Lewis's Journey to Faith. InterVarsity. 
 Downing, David C. (2005), Into the Region of Awe: Mysticism in C. S. Lewis. InterVarsity. 
 Downing, David C. (2005), Into the Wardrobe: C. S. Lewis and the Narnia Chronicles. San Francisco: Jossey-Bass. 
 
 Duriez, Colin (2003), Tolkien and C. S. Lewis: The Gift of Friendship. Paulist Press 
 Duriez, Colin (2015), Bedeviled: Lewis, Tolkien and the Shadow of Evil. InterVarsity Press 
 Duriez, Colin & David Porter (2001), The Inklings Handbook: The Lives, Thought and Writings of C. S. Lewis, J. R. R. Tolkien, Charles Williams, Owen Barfield, and Their Friends. London: Azure. 
 
 
 Edwards, Bruce L. (2005), Further Up and Further In: Understanding C. S. Lewis's The Lion, the Witch, and the Wardrobe. Broadman and Holman. 
 Edwards, Bruce L. (2005), Not a Tame Lion: The Spiritual World of Narnia. Tyndale. 
 
 Fowler, Alastair, "C. S. Lewis: Supervisor", Yale Review; Vol. 91, No. 4 (October 2003).
 
 Gardner, Helen (1966) "† Clive Staples Lewis, 1898–1963". Biographical memoir, in Proceedings of the British Academy 51 (1966), 417–28.
 Gibb, Jocelyn (ed.) (1965), Light on C. S. Lewis. Geoffrey Bles, 1965, & Harcourt Brace Jovanovich, 1976. 
 Gilbert, Douglas & Clyde Kilby (1973) C. S. Lewis: Images of His World. Eerdmans, 1973 & 2005. 
 
 
 
 Gresham, Douglas (1994), Lenten Lands: My Childhood with Joy Davidman and C. S. Lewis. HarperSanFrancisco. 
 Gresham, Douglas (2005), Jack's Life: A Memory of C. S. Lewis. Broadman & Holman Publishers. 
 Griffin, William (2005), C. S. Lewis: The Authentic Voice (formerly C. S. Lewis: A Dramatic Life). Lion. 
 Hart, Dabney Adams (1984), Through the Open Door: A New Look at C. S. Lewis. University of Alabama Press. 
 Heck, Joel D. (2006), Irrigating Deserts: C. S. Lewis on Education. Concordia Publishing House. 
 
 
 
 
 
 
 Keefe, Carolyn (1979), C. S. Lewis: Speaker & Teacher. Zondervan. 
 Kennedy, Jon (2008), The Everything Guide to C. S. Lewis and Narnia. Adams Media. 
 Kennedy, Jon (2012), C. S. Lewis Themes and Threads. Amazon Kindle ASIN B00ATSY3AQ
 Kilby, Clyde S. (1964), The Christian World of C. S. Lewis. Grand Rapids: Eerdmans, 1964, 1995. 
 King, Don W. (2001), C. S. Lewis, Poet: The Legacy of His Poetic Impulse. Kent, Ohio: Kent State University Press. 
 
 
 Lindskoog, Kathryn (1994), Light in the Shadowlands: Protecting the Real C. S. Lewis. Multnomah Pub. 
 Lowenberg, Susan (1993), C. S. Lewis: A Reference Guide, 1972–1988. Hall & Co. 
 Mardindale, Wayne & Jerry Root (1990), The Quotable Lewis. Tyndale House Publishers. 
 Martin, Thomas L. (ed.) (2000), Reading the Classics with C. S. Lewis. Baker Academic. 
 Miller, Laura (2008) "The Magician's Book", Little, Brown & Co. 
 Mills, David (ed) (1998) The Pilgrim's Guide: C. S. Lewis and the Art of Witness. Grand Rapids: Eerdmans. 
 
 
 
 Pearce, Joseph (1999), C. S. Lewis and the Catholic Church. HarperCollins, 1999; then Ignatius Press, 2003. 
 Peters, Thomas C. (1998), Simply C. S. Lewis: A Beginner's Guide to His Life and Works. Kingsway Publications. 
 Phillips, Justin (2003), C. S. Lewis at the BBC: Messages of Hope in the Darkness of War. Marshall Pickering. 
 Poe, Harry Lee & Rebecca Whitten Poe (eds) (2006), C. S. Lewis Remembered: Collected Reflections of Students, Friends & Colleagues. Zondervan. 
 Reppert, Victor (2003), C. S. Lewis's Dangerous Idea: In Defense of the Argument from Reason. InterVarsity Press. 
 Sayer, George (1988), Jack: C. S. Lewis and His Times. London: Macmillan. 
 Schakel, Peter J. (1984), Reason and Imagination in C. S. Lewis: A Study of "Till We Have Faces" . Grand Rapids: Eerdmans. 
 Schakel, Peter J. (2002), Imagination and the Arts in C. S. Lewis: Journeying to Narnia and Other Worlds. University of Missouri Press. 
 Schakel, Peter J. (ed.) (1977), The Longing for a Form: Essays on the Fiction of C. S. Lewis. Kent, Ohio: Kent State University Press. 
 Schakel, Peter J. & Charles A. Huttar (eds.) (1991), Word and Story in C. S. Lewis. University of Missouri Press. 
 Schofield, Stephen (1983), In Search of C. S. Lewis. Bridge Logos Pub. 
 Schultz, Jeffrey D. & John G. West, Jr. (eds) (1998), The C. S. Lewis Readers' Encyclopedia. Zondervan Publishing House. 
 Schwartz, Sanford (2009), C. S. Lewis on the Final Frontier: Science and the Supernatural in the Space Trilogy. Oxford University Press. .
 Tennyson, G. B. (ed.) (1989), Owen Barfield on C. S. Lewis. Wesleyan University Press 
 
 Wagner, Richard J. (2005) C. S. Lewis and Narnia for Dummies. For Dummies. 
 Walker, Andrew & Patrick James (eds.) (1998), Rumours of Heaven: Essays in Celebration of C. S. Lewis, Guildford: Eagle. 
 Walsh, Chad (1949), C. S. Lewis: Apostle to the Skeptics. London: Macmillan
 Walsh, Chad (1979), The Literary Legacy of C. S. Lewis. New York: Harcourt Brace Jovanovich. 
 Ward, Michael (2008), Planet Narnia. Oxford University Press. 
 Watson, George (ed.) (1992), Critical Essays on C. S. Lewis. Menston: Scolar Press. 
 White, Michael (2005), C. S. Lewis: The Boy Who Chronicled Narnia. Abacus. 
 Wielenberg, Erik J. (2007), God and the Reach of Reason. Cambridge University Press.

External links

 
 
 
 
 
 Journal of Inklings Studies peer-reviewed journal on Lewis and his literary circle, based at Oxford
 C. S. Lewis Reading Room, with extensive links to online primary and secondary literature (Tyndale Seminary)
 C. S. Lewis research collection at The Marion E. Wade Center at Wheaton College
 C. S. Lewis at the Encyclopedia of Science Fiction
 C. S. Lewis at the Encyclopedia of Fantasy
BBC Radio 4 – Great Lives – Suzannah Lipscomb on CS Lewis – 3 January 2017 Step though the wardrobe on Great Lives as CS Lewis – creator of the Narnia Chronicles – is this week's choice
 

 
1898 births
1963 deaths
Military personnel from Belfast
20th-century British male writers
20th-century British novelists
20th-century British philosophers
20th-century novelists from Northern Ireland
20th-century poets from Northern Ireland
20th-century pseudonymous writers
Alumni of University College, Oxford
Anglican poets
Anglican philosophers
Anglican writers
Anglicans from Northern Ireland
British Army personnel of World War I
British children's writers
British fantasy writers
British Home Guard soldiers
British literary critics
British science fiction writers
British spiritual writers
Burials in Oxfordshire
Carnegie Medal in Literature winners
Children's writers from Northern Ireland
Christian apologists
Christian humanists
Christian novelists
Converts to Anglicanism from atheism or agnosticism
Critics of atheism
Deaths from kidney failure
Fantasy writers from Northern Ireland
Fellows of Magdalen College, Oxford
Fellows of Magdalene College, Cambridge
Fellows of the British Academy
Formalist poets
Inklings
Irish Anglo-Catholics
Lay theologians
Literary critics from Northern Ireland
Literary critics of English
Male novelists from Northern Ireland
Male poets from Northern Ireland
Male writers from Northern Ireland
Mythopoeic writers
Officers' Training Corps officers
People educated at Campbell College
People educated at Malvern College
People from Headington
People from Northern Ireland of Welsh descent
Philosophers from Northern Ireland
Philosophers of love
Professors of Medieval and Renaissance English (Cambridge)
Science fiction writers from Northern Ireland
Somerset Light Infantry officers
Spiritual writers from Northern Ireland
Writers about religion and science
Writers from Belfast
Writers from Oxford
Lost Generation writers